M. K. Keshavan (1936 - 10 July 1997) was an Indian politician and leader of Communist Party of India. He represented Vaikom constituency in 5th, 6th, 7th  and 10th KLA.

References

Communist Party of India politicians from Kerala
1936 births
1997 deaths
Kerala MLAs 1977–1979
Kerala MLAs 1980–1982
Kerala MLAs 1982–1987
Kerala MLAs 1996–2001